Coleophora lineolea is a moth of the family Coleophoridae. It is found in most of Europe.

Adults have yellowish ochre veins. They are on wing from late June to August.

The larvae feed on Labiates including black horehound (Ballota nigra), dead nettles (Lamium species), white horehound (Marrubium vulgare), Phlomis species, Stachys alopecuros, lamb's-ear (Stachys byzantina), betony (Stachys officinalis), stiff hedgenettle (Stachys recta) and  hedge woundwort (Stachys sylvatica). Young larvae make a full depth, quickly widening corridor. The frass is deposited as small grains in a broad central band. The corridor widens into a blotch from which the youth case is cut. The mouth angle is about 90°. Full-grown larvae can be found from the end of May to the end of July.

References

External links
 

lineolea
Moths described in 1828
Moths of Europe
Taxa named by Adrian Hardy Haworth